Marcius Melhem (born February 8, 1972), is a Brazilian actor, humorist, contributing editor, comedian and voice actor mostly known for his work at Rede Globo, the largest television network in Brazil. He also works as a writer of television programs and author of plays. In 2018, he became head of the comedy department of Rede Globo, and was the one who wrote the most for that area.

Biography
Melhem has a degree in journalism from the Pontifical Catholic University of Rio de Janeiro. He was a director of journalism at Agência Leia de Notícias, which produced content in real time for the domestic financial market.

One of his most well-known works on television was the comedy show Os Caras de Pau, which aired from 2010 to 2013.

In late 2019, Melhem retired from his career for "personal reasons". One of his daughters needed severe health care. On August 14, 2020, his seventeen-year old contract with Rede Globo ends by mutual agreement. Globo thanks Melhem for the seventeen-year old of success. He is being accused of sexual assault by multiple women in an ongoing investigation. By February of 2022, eight more women came forward.

Filmography

Television

Films

Theater

Awards and nominations 

    |-
	| 2020 || align="center" | - || ABRA de Roteiro || 
    |-
	| 2017 || align="center" | - || Emmy Internacional || 
    |-
	| 2016 || align="center" | - || Emmy Internacional || 
	|-
	| 2012 || align="center" | - || Melhores do Ano || 
	|-
	| rowspan="2" | 2010 || align="center" | - || Meus Prêmios Nick || 
	|-
	| align="center" |  - || Arte e Qualidade Brasil || 
	|-
	| 2009 || align="center" | - || Melhores do Ano || 
	|-
	| 2008 || align="center" | - || Contigo de Televisão || 
	|-
	| 2006 || align="center" | - || Zilka Salaberry || 
	|-
	| 1992 || align="center" | - || Mérito de Ator Revelação || 
|}

References

External links 
 

1972 births
Living people
Brazilian male comedians
Brazilian male film actors
Brazilian male television actors
People from Nilópolis